Miss Israel ( Malkat HaYofi, lt. The Beauty Queen) is a national Beauty pageant in Israel. The 2003 competition was held in Haifa, and had 20 contestants.

Results

Judges
Irit Admoni Perlman
Galit Gutmann
Yaki halperin
Dany Mizrachi
Miriam Nofech-Mozes
Ronit Raphael
Galit Wertheim

References

2003 beauty pageants
2003 in Israel
Miss Israel
Haifa